The Brandon Community Sportsplex is a multipurpose recreation facility located in the city of Brandon, Manitoba, Canada.

The Sportsplex was built by the City of Brandon in the mid 1970s as a venue for the 1979 Canada Winter Games. It features an indoor ice hockey arena, a 50 metre swimming pool, racquetball courts, and track and field facilities. Since the 1979 Winter Games, the Sportsplex has been made available to the public for recreational use.

The hockey arena is one of four indoor arenas that serve the city of Brandon, the other three being located within the Keystone Centre. The Sportsplex is home to the Brandon Wheat Kings of the Manitoba Midget 'AAA' Hockey League and is also used by the city's minor hockey, speed skating, and figure skating programs.

The Sportsplex was once again used as a venue for the Canada Games in 1997 when Brandon hosted the Summer Games. In preparation for the games, its facilities received extensive upgrades.

The swimming pool was slated for closure in 2011, but after public pressure to keep it open, Brandon city council decided not to close the pool.  As a result, the city now has two pools, the other being at the local YMCA.  The pool was later deemed inadequate by the Canada Games Council for the 2017 Canada Summer Games.  As city council decided not to upgrade or expand the Sportsplex, the city's bid for the 2017 Games was rejected.

External links
Official Website

References

Indoor ice hockey venues in Canada
Swimming venues in Canada
Sports venues in Brandon, Manitoba
Canada Games venues
Indoor arenas in Manitoba
1970s establishments in Manitoba
Sports venues completed in the 1970s
Ice hockey in Brandon, Manitoba